The following tables compare general and technical information for notable computer cluster software. This software can be grossly separated in four categories: Job scheduler, nodes management, nodes installation and integrated stack (all the above).

General information 

Table explanation
 Software: The name of the application that is described

Technical information 

Table Explanation
 Software: The name of the application that is described
 SMP aware:
 basic: hard split into multiple virtual host
 basic+: hard split into multiple virtual host with some minimal/incomplete communication between virtual host on the same computer
 dynamic: split the resource of the computer (CPU/Ram) on demand

See also 
 List of volunteer computing projects
 List of cluster management software
 Computer cluster
 Grid computing
 World Community Grid
 Distributed computing
 Distributed resource management
 High-Throughput Computing
 Job Processing Cycle
 Batch processing
 Fallacies of Distributed Computing

Cluster computing
Cluster software
Job scheduling